is an ancient Vietnamese geographical name in what is now northern Thanh Hóa Province. It was the first location of the Lam Sơn uprising led by Lê Lợi against Ming rule. Several other Vietnamese geographical locations are named after this name, including:

Lam Sơn, Haiphong, a ward of Lê Chân District
Lam Sơn, Hưng Yên, a ward of Hưng Yên
Lam Sơn, Thanh Hóa City, ward of Thanh Hóa city in Thanh Hóa Province
Lam Sơn, Bỉm Sơn, a ward of Bỉm Sơn in Thanh Hóa Province
Lam Sơn, Thọ Xuân, a township of Thọ Xuân District in Thanh Hóa Province
Lam Sơn, Nghệ An, a commune of Đô Lương District
Lam Sơn, Bắc Kạn, a commune of Na Rì District
Lam Sơn, Ngọc Lặc, a commune of Ngọc Lặc District in Thanh Hóa Province
Lam Sơn, Hải Dương, a commune of Thanh Miện District

See also
Lam Son High School, a public school in Thanh Hóa city and is the first high school in Thanh Hóa Province
Lâm Sơn (disambiguation)
Operation Lam Son II
Operation Lam Son 719